= Palo Labrado =

Coordinates: 28°21′S 65°37′W

- Municipality and village
- Interactive map of Palo Labrado
- Country: Argentina
- Province: Catamarca Province
- Time zone: UTC−3 (ART)

Palo Labrado is a village and municipality in Catamarca Province in northwestern Argentina.
